Born to Be a Star is a reality-singing competition produced by TV5 and Viva Entertainment. It was one of the first of many co-productions of TV5 with Viva. The program started on February 6, 2016, and aired every Sunday nights on the same channel. The second season of the program started on January 30, 2021, and aired every Saturday nights on the channel.

The idea was conceived by then-TV5 Entertainment Chief Strategist Vic del Rosario. In early 2010, del Rosario planned to launch BTBAS with Viva talent Sarah Geronimo and the newest Kapatid personality at the time, Willie Revillame as hosts. The later came to fruition when del Rosario joined the ranks of TV5's entertainment department.

In the inaugural season, Ogie Alcasid, Mark Bautista and Yassi Pressman served as the show's main hosts, while OPM hitmakers Aiza Seguerra, Andrew E., Pops Fernandez and Rico Blanco served as the judges of the singing competition open for aspiring 13- to 18-year-old singers.

The grand winner of the competition would take home a total of 3 million pesos of prizes including a 1 million-peso cash prize, a management contract from TV5 and Viva Artists Agency and a house and lot.

According to Monti Parungao, the show's director, the contestants would have to pass the two pre-audition processes before they would make it in the competition. In the weekly rounds, four contestants will be introduced per week and in the beginning of the performance, the program tackled the stories (or makings of a star) of the contestants before joining the competition. The winner of the weekly round will undergo make-over sessions and vocal lessons. All winners of the weekly rounds will be qualified for the monthly round, of which one contestant will then move on to the grand finals.

The first grand finals of Born to Be a Star was held on May 29, 2016, with Shanne Dandan as its grand winner.

In October 2020, Viva Entertainment announced that Born to Be a Star would be returning for a second season on TV5, slated to air on January 30, 2021. In January 2021, Viva and TV5 announced that Matteo Guidicelli and Kim Molina would serve as the new hosts in Season 2, replacing the trio of Alcasid, Bautista, and Pressman. Also, Andrew E. is the lone returning judge, to be joined by Sam Concepcion, Katrina Velarde, and Georcelle Dapat-Sy completing the judges panel. The revival premiered on January 23, 2021 on the network's Saturday primetime slot at 7 p.m., replacing Masked Singer Pilipinas.

The second grand finals of Born to Be a Star was held on May 8, 2021, with Jehramae Trangia as its second grand winner.

Overview

Hosts

Season 1
 Ogie Alcasid
 Mark Bautista
 Yassi Pressman

Season 2
 Matteo Guidicelli
 Kim Molina

Judges

Season 1
 Rico Blanco
 Andrew E.
 Pops Fernandez
 Aiza Seguerra

Season 2
 Andrew E.
 Sam Concepcion
 Georcelle Dapat-Sy
 Katrina Velarde
 Janine Teñoso

See also
List of programs broadcast by TV5

References

Philippine reality television series
TV5 (Philippine TV network) original programming
2016 Philippine television series debuts
Filipino-language television shows